Jon Huntsman may refer to:

 Jon Huntsman Sr. (1937–2018), corporate executive and philanthropist (father of Jon Huntsman Jr.)
 Jon Huntsman Jr. (born 1960), U.S. politician and the former U.S. ambassador to Russia, China and Singapore
 John A. Huntsman (1867–1902), American Medal of Honor recipient for actions during the Philippine–American War